Ed Buckingham is a Canadian former politician from the province of Newfoundland and Labrador. Buckingham represented the district of St. John's East in the Newfoundland and Labrador House of Assembly. He was elected in the 2007 provincial election as a member of the Progressive Conservative Party. He lost his seat in the 2011 provincial election to the NDP.

Electoral history

|-

|NDP
|George Murphy
|align="right"|2,766
|align="right"|52.11%
|align="right"|
|-

|-

|}

|-

|-

|NDP
|Gemma Schlamp-Hickey
|align="right"|864
|align="right"|16.6%
|align="right"|
|-

|}

References

Progressive Conservative Party of Newfoundland and Labrador MHAs
Living people
Politicians from St. John's, Newfoundland and Labrador
21st-century Canadian politicians
Year of birth missing (living people)